Yellow pimpernel is a common name for several plants and may refer to:

Lysimachia nemorum
Taenidia integerrima, native to eastern North America